WHTD (106.3 MHz, known on air as "Power 107.5 & 106.3," is a commercial FM radio station licensed to London, Ohio, and serving the Columbus metropolitan area. It airs an urban contemporary radio format and is owned by Urban One. WHTD and sister station WCKX simulcast their programming. The two stations carry the syndicated The Morning Hustle weekdays from 6 to 10 a.m.

The studios and offices are on East First Avenue, just north of downtown. The transmitter is off London-Lockbourne Road in London.

History
The station was first licensed on May 26, 1993 as WCKX. When WCKX moved from 106.3 in London to 107.5 in Columbus on December 26, 1997, the call letters were changed to WMXG. The station became WCZZ on October 2, 1998. When 106.3 was known as WCKX, it was the Columbus area's only R&B and Hip Hop station, yet suffered from poor ratings because of its tower location in London, since the primary signal coverage can only reach the western fringes of Franklin County while it puts in a secondary coverage in the Columbus Metropolitan area. The former WJZA at 107.5 became huge competition for "Power 106.3" in the late 90s and was eventually bought by Radio One and transferred to the 107.5 signal where they have enjoyed great success. In July 2000, the station flipped to urban gospel, branded as "Joy 106.3" with the WJYD calls adopted on July 31 of that year. On September 16, 2011, the station became the new home of WXMG's Urban AC format, and rebranded as "Magic 106.3." On September 23, WJYD changed their call letters to WXMG.

On November 13, 2015, WXMG began simulcasting on WZOH-FM after Radio One purchased it and WHOK-FM from Wilks Broadcasting, as Radio One announced they would be moving the "Magic" format to the new frequency. After simulcasting for three days, WXMG flipped to classic hip hop, branded as "Boom 106.3", on November 16 at Noon. The station changed its call sign to WBMO on November 23, 2015.

On November 28, 2017, at 10 a.m., WBMO dropped classic hip hop for a simulcast with WCKX.

The station would adopt new call letters WHTD on February 1, 2022.

References

External links

Radio stations established in 1993
HTD (FM)
Urban One stations
1993 establishments in Ohio
Urban contemporary radio stations in the United States